Arsenault is a French surname. Notable people with the surname include:

Adrien Arsenault (1889–1941), Canadian politician
Adrienne Arsenault (born 1967), Canadian journalist
Angèle Arsenault (1943–2014), Canadian-Acadian musician
Aubin-Edmond Arsenault (1870–1968), Canadian politician
Bona Arsenault (1903–1993), Canadian politician
Damien Arsenault (born 1960), Canadian politician
Daniel Arsenault, American photographer 
Duncan Arsenault (born 1974), American musician
Frank Arsenault (1919–1974), American percussionist
Joseph F. H. Arsenault (1866–1946), Canadian politician
Joseph-Félix Arsenault (1865–1947), Canadian politician
Joseph-Octave Arsenault (1828–1897), Canadian politician
Mary-Anne Arsenault (born 1968), Canadian curler 
Nina Arsenault (born 1974), Canadian transsexual writer
Nérée Arsenault (1911-1982), Canadian politician
Pierre Arsenault (born 1963), American baseball coach
Prosper Arsenault (1894–1987), Canadian politician
Raymond Arsenault (born 1948), American historian
Samantha Arsenault (born 1981), American swimmer 
Télésphore Arsenault (1872–1964), Canadian politician
Wilfred Arsenault (1953-2011), Canadian politician

See also

Arseneault
Arseneau
Arceneaux

French-language surnames